"You're the First Time I've Thought About Leaving" is a song written by Dickey Lee and Kerry Chater, and recorded by American country music artist Reba McEntire.  It was released in January 1983 as the third single from the album Unlimited.  The song was McEntire's second number one on the country chart.  The single stayed at number one for one week and spent a total of fourteen weeks on the country chart.

Charts

Weekly charts

Year-end charts

References

Reba McEntire songs
1983 singles
Songs written by Dickey Lee
Song recordings produced by Jerry Kennedy
Mercury Records singles
Songs written by Kerry Chater
1982 songs